The 2008 Nippon Professional Baseball season was the 59th season since the NPB was reorganized in . The regular season started on March 20 with the Pacific League opener, and on March 28 with the Central League opener. On March 25 and 26, the Boston Red Sox and Oakland Athletics played 2 regular season Major League Baseball games at Tokyo Dome. During their visit, they also played exhibition games against the Hanshin Tigers and Yomiuri Giants.

Format

Both League
 Season Format
 Regular Season
 Climax Series 1st Stage: Regular Season 2nd place vs. Regular Season 3rd place – Best of 3
 Climax Series 2nd Stage: Regular Season 1st place vs. Climax Series 1st Stage winner – Best of 7 (regular-season 1st place take a one-win advantage)
 Regular Season 1st place is the champion

Japan Series
 Central League Climax Series 2nd Stage winner vs. Pacific League Climax Series 2nd Stage winner – Best of 7

Changes
The Seibu Lions added the prefecture name "Saitama" in front of the team name starting with this season.

As to reduce the interference to teams whose main players would play in the Olympic Games, this year's trade and new foreign players deadlines were pushed to the end of July, instead of the end of June. Also, teams having more than three players selected by National teams were given an extra quota of foreign player limit during the Olympic Games.

The postseason playoff ("Climax Series") regulations have changed to give more advantages to League Champions, now the second stage series will play for 6 games, while the League Champion will have a one-win advantage.

In late June, the Free Agency regulation was amended after negotiation between the players committee and owners. Players are now eligible for free agency after 8 years of service to a team (1 playing year = 145 days on the active roster), players drafted before 2007 are shortened to 7 (University/Company/Independent League) to 8 (High School) years. However, oversea FA right which allow them to play in the Major League Baseball still needs 9 playing years. This amendment is also effective on non-Japanese players. Alex Ramírez, who served 8 playing years in Japan, became a "local player" after the season.

Standings

Central League

Regular season

Climax Series 1st Stage
Hanshin Tigers (1) vs. Chunichi Dragons (2)

Climax Series 2nd Stage
Yomiuri Giants (3) vs. Chunichi Dragons (1) The Giants have a one-game advantage.

Pacific League

Regular season

Climax Series 1st Stage
Orix Buffaloes (0) vs. Hokkaido Nippon-Ham Fighters (2)

Climax Series 2nd Stage
Saitama Seibu Lions (4) vs. Hokkaido Nippon-Ham Fighters (2) The Lions have a one-game advantage.

Interleague Games

Climax Series

Note: All of the games that are played in the first two rounds of the Climax Series are held at the higher seed's home stadium. The team with the higher regular-season standing also advances if the round ends in a tie.

Japan Series
Saitama Seibu Lions (4) vs. Yomiuri Giants (3)

See also
2008 Korea Professional Baseball season
2008 Major League Baseball season

References

Central League standings
Pacific League standings

External links
 

 
Nippon Professional Baseball